The Rocher du Midi is a mountain in the western Bernese Alps, overlooking Château d'Oex in the canton of Vaud. It is located on the massif between the valley of the Sarine and L'Etivaz and culminating at the Gummfluh.

The summit is accessible by a trail via the Col de Base.

References

External links
Rocher du Midi on Hikr.org

Mountains of the Alps
Mountains of Switzerland
Mountains of the canton of Vaud